Andimadam was one of the 234 constituencies in the Tamil Nadu Legislative Assembly of Tamil Nadu a southern state of India. It was in Chidambaram (Lok Sabha constituency) and also in Ariyalur district.

Members of the Legislative Assembly

In the 2011 election, Andimadam Constituency merged with Jayankondam and Kunnam constituencies.

Election results

2006

2001

1996

1991

1989

1984

1980

1977

1971

1967

References

External links
 

Former assembly constituencies of Tamil Nadu